Mark Edward Loane AM (born 11 July 1954) is an Australian former rugby union football player, who played 89 games for Queensland and 28 Tests for the Wallabies. Described by Bret Harris in his book, The Marauding Maroons, as "the closest thing to a folk hero Queensland has seen", Loane was noted for devastating barging runs and on occasion the game would be won by one of these characteristic bursts.

Early life and family
The son of a judge who moved around Northern Queensland on judicial matters, Mark Loane was born in Ipswich, Queensland. He first attended Gympie Christian Brothers before being sent St. Joseph's Nudgee College as a boarder. He is married to Elizabeth Loane (née O'Neil) and has two daughters.

Rugby career
Loane's senior rugby started in 1973 at the University of Queensland Rugby Club where he was coached by former Wallabies, Jules Guerassimoff and Chilla Wilson. State and national coach Bob Templeton was closely involved at the club. Loane came to Templeton's attention and was he selected aged eighteen to represent Australia when Tonga toured in 1973. He played in both Tests. The following year he made an appearance against the All Blacks.

In 1975 he played in a Test match against Japan and in two Tests against a touring England team. He was selected that year to make the 1975–76 Australia rugby union tour of Britain and Ireland led by John Hipwell. Loane played in consecutive tour matches 1 through 4 but was injured in the game against London Counties and missed a number of matches including the Scottish and Welsh Tests. He played in eight straight games when he recovered, including the Tests against England and Ireland.

In 1976 Loane played in all three Tests matches against the visiting Fijians and also captained Queensland against them. He was also selected for the short 1976 Australia rugby union tour of Europe under captain Geoff Shaw. Two years later when Wales visited Loane again captained Queensland against the visitors and played in two spiteful Test matches, both won. He made the 1978 Australia rugby union tour of New Zealand and although Loane was in the incumbent Queensland captain, his state rival Tony Shaw was selected by coach Daryl Haberecht as the squad's captain. Injury restricted Loane to just two tour match appearances against Hawkes Bay and Manawatu.

Loane's first Test as national captain was the 1979 Test against the All Blacks at the Sydney Cricket Ground which Australia won 12–6 to take back the Bledisloe Cup for the first time in 30 years. He also played against Ireland in two Tests and again captained the Queensland state side. That year the ARU showed full confidence in his leadership selecting him as squad captain for the 1979 Australia rugby union tour of Argentina, the first Wallaby tour to South America. He played in six of the seven matches including both Tests, for one win and one loss.

His role in University's 1979 Grand Final victory will be remembered. The first Grand Final was drawn after extra time against traditional rivals, Brothers, and another match was scheduled for the following week to decide the victors. In all, 200 minutes of rugby had to be played before the victory could be celebrated. Once he had completed his medical studies in 1980 Loane relocated to South Africa to gain medical experience. He played rugby there in the Currie Cup and was selected as a junior Springbok. On his return to Australia in 1981 he immediately went into the Test team against France and captained Queensland against Italy.

Howell asserts that Loane's career peaked in 1981 when at aged 27 he was selected under the captaincy of his state arch-rival Tony Shaw on the 1981–82 Australia rugby union tour of Britain and Ireland. Loane would captain the side in the Test against England when Shaw was dropped from the team following the Scottish Test. Shaw had retaliated recklessly to niggling from Scots player Bill Cuthbertson with a king-hit right in front of the referee. Shaw was to pay dearly for this as it would mark the end of his Test captaincy career. Loane also captained the side in four tour matches.

Later that year Loane's stellar career came to an end after he captained Queensland and then Australia in two Tests against the visiting Scottish national side. All told Loane captained Australia for six Tests and seven other tour matches between 1979 and 1982. He captained Queensland in many matches against touring sides and in several distinctive wins over NSW from the late 70s until 1982.

Professional career
Loane works as an ophthalmic surgeon with Vision Eye Institute, specialising in cataract surgery, glaucoma and general ophthalmology. He has a strong passion in the provision of ophthalmic services to indigenous people, particularly those of the Cape York Peninsula.

Accolades
On 23 September 2000, Loane was awarded with the Australian Sports Medal for having played more than 50 games for Queensland and for his contribution to the development of rugby in Queensland. In 2007 he was honoured in the third tranche of inductees into the Australian Rugby Union Hall of Fame.

On 26 January 2011, Loane was named as Member of the Order of Australia for service to medicine in the field of ophthalmology, particularly to the indigenous communities of northern Queensland, and as a contributor to the development of sustainable health services.

References

Published sources
 Fitzsimons, Peter (2001) John Eales: The Biography
 Howell, Max (2005) Born to Lead – Wallaby Test Captains, Celebrity Books, Auckland NZ

1954 births
Australia international rugby union players
Australian rugby union captains
Australian rugby union players
Brothers Old Boys players
Living people
University of Queensland Mayne Medical School alumni
Members of the Order of Australia
Sharks (Currie Cup) players
Recipients of the Australian Sports Medal
Rugby union players from Ipswich, Queensland
Rugby union flankers